Virginia City is a town in and the county seat of Madison County, Montana, United States.  In 1961 the town and the surrounding area were designated a National Historic Landmark District, the Virginia City Historic District. The population was 219 at the 2020 census.

History

Founding

In May 1863, a group of prospectors were headed toward the Yellowstone River and instead came upon a party of the Crow tribe and was forced to return to Bannack. On May 26, 1863, Bill Fairweather and Henry Edgar discovered gold near Alder Creek.  The prospectors could not keep the site a secret and were followed on their return to the gold bearing site. A mining district was set up in order to formulate rules about individual gold claims. On June 16, 1863, under the name of "Verina" the township was formed a mile south of the gold fields. The name was intended to honor Varina Howell Davis, the first and only First Lady of the Confederate States of America during the American Civil War. Verina, although in Union territory, was founded by men whose loyalties were thoroughly Confederate. Upon registration of the name, a Connecticut judge, G. G. Bissell, objected to their choice and recorded it as Virginia City.

Within weeks Virginia City was a boomtown of thousands of prospectors and fortune seekers in the midst of a gold rush. The remote region of the Idaho Territory was without law enforcement or justice system with the exception of miners' courts. In late 1863, the great wealth in the region, lack of a justice system and the insecure means of travel gave rise to serious criminal activity, especially robbery and murder along the trails and roads of the region.  Road agents as they became known were ultimately responsible for up to 100 deaths in the region in 1863 and 1864.  This resulted in the formation of the Vigilance committee of Alder Gulch and the infamous Montana Vigilantes. Up to 15 road agents were hanged by the vigilantes in December 1863 and January 1864, including the sheriff of Bannack, Montana and alleged leader of the road agent gang, Henry Plummer.

The Montana Territory was organized out of the existing Idaho Territory by Act of Congress and signed into law by President Abraham Lincoln on May 26, 1864. Although Bannack was the first territorial capital, the territorial legislature moved the capital to Virginia City on February 7, 1865.  It remained the capital until April 19, 1875, when it moved to Helena, Montana. Thomas Dimsdale began publication of Montana's first newspaper, the Montana Post, in Virginia City on August 27, 1864.  Montana's first public school was established in Virginia City in March 1866.

Preservation
In the 1940s, Charles and Sue Bovey began buying the town, putting much needed maintenance into failing structures. The ghost town of Virginia City began to be restored for tourism in the 1950s. The Boveys operated the town as an open-air museum complete with artifacts and living history enactments. Of the nearly 300 structures in town, almost half were built before 1900. Buildings in their original condition with Old West period displays and information plaques stand next to presently active restaurants, gift shops, and other businesses. The town received National Historic Landmark status in 1962, and many of its buildings have been added to the National Register of Historic Places.

The National Park Service (NPS) considered adding the town to its system, conducting studies in 1937, 1980 and 1995. In the end, the state of Montana bought most of the historic buildings after the legislature authorized the purchase of the Bovey properties. Today, the Historic District of Virginia City and Nevada City is operated by the Montana Heritage Commission with financial and technical assistance from the NPS. The commission operates gold panning, the Nevada City Music Hall and Museum, and the Alder Gulch Railroad.

Virginia City also has a Boot Hill cemetery, where the graves of Jack Gallagher, Boone Helm, "Clubfoot" George Lane, Hayes Lyons, and Frank Parrish; all road agents killed during Virginia City's vigilante era; are placed in a location neighboring Virginia City's main graveyard. The  narrow gauge Alder Gulch Short Line Railroad transports passengers by rail to the nearby ghost town of Nevada City, Montana, and back.

The backdrop as well as the staged bar photos used in fine art pieces by David Yarrow is located in Virginia City at the Pioneer bar.

Filmography

The film The Missouri Breaks (1976) was partly filmed in Virginia City.  The bar scenes in Little Big Man (1970) were filmed in the Bale of Hay Saloon, a landmark and watering hole in Virginia City.

Notable people

 Sarah Bickford, African American businesswoman, former slave, and first African-American woman owner of a utility company in Montana.
 John Bozeman, prospector, merchant, founder of Bozeman, Montana and Bozeman Trail.
 Calamity Jane lived here for some time.
 Helen M. Duncan, geologist and paleontologist, grew up in Virginia City.
 Hezekiah L. Hosmer, first Chief Justice of Montana Territory Supreme Court, held court here.
 Nathaniel P. Langford, prospector, vigilante and first superintendent of Yellowstone National Park.
 Thomas Francis Meagher, Irish nationalist, Civil War general, Secretary of State and acting governor of Montana Territory
 Joseph Millard, later a United States Senator from Nebraska, lived and opened a bank here.
 Jack Slade, Pony Express co-founder and gunfighter, was lynched here.
 Nelson Story, prospector, merchant and cattleman, famous for 1866 cattle drive from Texas to Montana.
 Wilbur F. Sanders, founding member of the Vigilance Committee and United States Senator from Montana, lived here.
 George Laird Shoup, Governor of Idaho, moved here after the Civil War.
 Sam V. Stewart, Governor and Supreme Court justice of Montana, practiced law here.
 Granville Stuart, prospector, vigilante, merchant, operated a store in Virginia City during the gold boom.
 William Boyce Thompson, founder of Newmont Mining, was born here.
 A. A. Townsend, prospector, miner, farmer, Captain of the Townsend Wagon Train who arrived in Virginia City on Aug 25, 1864.

Geography
Virginia City is located at  (45.294107, -111.941230). Montana Highway 287 passes through town.

Climate
According to the Köppen Climate Classification system, Virginia City has a borderline humid continental climate (Köppen Dfb) bordering on a cold semi-arid climate (BSk) and a subalpine climate (Dfc). The data below are from the Western Regional Climate Center over the years 1893 to 2016.

Demographics

2010 census
As of the census of 2010, there were 190 people, 102 households, and 55 families residing in the town. The racial makeup of the town was 91.6% White, 0.5% Asian, 0.5% from other races, and 7.4% from two or more races. Hispanic or Latino of any race were 1.6% of the population.

There were 102 households, of which 17.6% had children under the age of 18 living with them, 40.2% were married couples living together, 9.8% had a female householder with no husband present, 3.9% had a male householder with no wife present, and 46.1% were non-families. 42.2% of all households were made up of individuals, and 11.8% had someone living alone who was 65 years of age or older. The average household size was 1.86 and the average family size was 2.49.

The median age in the town was 51.3 years. 15.3% of residents were under the age of 18; 3.6% were between the ages of 18 and 24; 23.1% were from 25 to 44; 39.6% were from 45 to 64; and 18.4% were 65 years of age or older. The gender makeup of the town was 49.5% male and 50.5% female.

2000 census
As of the census of 2000, there were 130 people, 72 households, and 32 families residing in the town. The population density was 140.4 people per square mile (54.0/km2). There were 122 housing units at an average density of 131.7 per square mile (50.7/km2). The racial makeup of the town was 94.62% White, 2.31% Native American, 0.77% from other races, and 2.31% from two or more races. Hispanic or Latino of any race were 0.77% of the population.

There were 72 households, out of which 18.1% had children under the age of 18 living with them, 40.3% were married couples living together, 1.4% had a female householder with no husband present, and 54.2% were non-families. 47.2% of all households were made up of individuals, and 15.3% had someone living alone who was 65 years of age or older. The average household size was 1.81 and the average family size was 2.52.

In the town, the population was spread out, with 14.6% under the age of 18, 0.8% from 18 to 24, 23.8% from 25 to 44, 46.9% from 45 to 64, and 13.8% who were 65 years of age or older. The median age was 48 years. For every 100 females, there were 106.3 males. For every 100 females age 18 and over, there were 117.6 males.

The median income for a household in the town was $30,000, and the median income for a family was $46,250. Males had a median income of $37,500 versus $19,167 for females. The per capita income for the town was $19,182. There are 5.7% of the population living below the poverty line, including those under eighteens and over 64.

Education
Thompson-Hickman County Library is a public library located in Virginia City.

References

External links

 Virginia City Chamber of Commerce website
 

Montana Territory
Towns in Madison County, Montana
County seats in Montana
Former colonial and territorial capitals in the United States
Mining communities in Montana
Populated places established in 1863
Ghost towns in Montana
Boot Hill cemeteries
American frontier
Montana articles lacking sources
1863 establishments in Idaho Territory